The 2000 Tunbridge Wells Borough Council election took place on 4 May 2000 to elect members of Tunbridge Wells Borough Council in Kent, England. One third of the council was up for election and the Conservative Party stayed in overall control of the council.

After the election, the composition of the council was:
Conservative 31
Liberal Democrat 11
Labour 5
Independent 1

Results

References

2000 English local elections
2000
2000s in Kent